In My Opinion is the debut studio album by Norwegian musician trance producer and DJ Ørjan Nilsen. It was released on January 1, 2011 through Armada Music.

Track listing
 The Thunder (featuring Kate Louis Smith) [7:16]
 Dominatrix [5:38]
 Mjuzik [5:07]
 Redemption (featuring Arielle Maren) [6:20]
 So Long Radio [3:53]
 Le Tour De Trance [5:35]
 Anywhere But Here (featuring Neev Kennedy) [5:23]
 La Guitarra [3:48]
 In My Opinion [5:04]
 Between The Rays [3:56]
 The Mule [2:43]
 Go Fast! [6:52]
 Down The Line [5:29]
 While I Wait [5:26]
 Nocturnal [4:24]
 Gato Negro (Original Mix) [7:26] (iTunes Special Bonus Track Edition)
 Rock with Me (Original Mix) [6:34] (iTunes Special Bonus Track Edition)
 Black Blue Beautiful (Original Mix) [8:05] (iTunes Special Bonus Track Edition)

References

2011 debut albums
Ørjan Nilsen albums
Armada Music albums